The House of Teglev is an old Russian noble family which can trace it's line back to 15th century.

History 
The family descends from Yuri Tegl, the great-grandson of an attendant of Vasily II of Moscow. The family were added to the nobility of the Grand Duchy of Moscow in the seventeenth century.

The coat of arms of the Tyeglev family is included in the second part of the General Armorial of the Noble Families of the Russian Empire.

Notable family members 
 Alexandra Tegleva (1894–1955), Nursemaid to the imperial family
 Alexey Vasilievich Teglev (1791-1854), Rear-Admiral of the Imperial Russian Navy
 Semyon Matveevich Teglev (:ru:Теглев, Семён Матвеевич; 1771–1849), Sculptor and archivist of the Imperial Academy of Arts

References 

Russian noble families